The Singles 1992–2003 is a greatest hits album by American rock band No Doubt, released on November 14, 2003, by Interscope Records. It features 13 of the band's singles from three studio albums—Tragic Kingdom (1995), Return of Saturn (2000), and Rock Steady (2001)—and the single "Trapped in a Box" from their 1992 self-titled debut album. The album also included a cover of Talk Talk's 1984 song "It's My Life", the only new song on the album and which was released as a single. It was released alongside the DVD Rock Steady Live, a video of a concert as part of the band's Rock Steady tour in 2002, and the box set Boom Box, which contained The Singles 1992–2003, Everything in Time, The Videos 1992–2003, and Live in the Tragic Kingdom.

No Doubt went into hiatus in April 2003 after the release of four singles from their fifth studio album, Rock Steady, allowing the four members to spend time with loved ones. This also allowed their lead singer, Gwen Stefani, to work on her solo music side project, under which she has released three albums, Love. Angel. Music. Baby. (2004), The Sweet Escape (2006), and This Is What the Truth Feels Like (2016). The band regrouped in September 2003 to record the lead single for the album, "It's My Life", with producer Nellee Hooper. Additionally, in May 2010, the band regrouped again to start work on their latest record.

The album received mostly positive reviews from music critics, who praised the variety of music genres on the album. It reached number two on the US Billboard 200, and has been certified double platinum in the United States, United Kingdom and Canada, and platinum in Australia.

Background
No Doubt released their fifth studio album, Rock Steady, in December 2001 and from it released four singles, "Hey Baby", "Hella Good", "Underneath It All", and "Running" between 2001 and 2003. The album was commercially successful, selling three million copies worldwide and being certified platinum by the Recording Industry Association of America (RIAA). In April 2003, No Doubt went into hiatus to take a break to spend time with their families before starting to compile The Singles 1992–2003, which would feature the band's greatest hits from their previous albums.

The main reason to go into hiatus was that, in early 2003, their lead singer Gwen Stefani started work on her 1980s-inspired music side project, under which she released two solo albums—Love. Angel. Music. Baby. on November 23, 2004, and The Sweet Escape on December 5, 2006 (in addition to another solo album in 2016, after a No Doubt reunion album in 2012).

Music
The album was a compilation of 13 commercially released singles by the band from their previous studio albums, Tragic Kingdom, Return of Saturn, and Rock Steady, as well as the independently released single "Trapped in a Box" from No Doubt's self-titled debut studio album, and a brand-new cover version of "It's My Life". However, The Singles did not include "Happy Now?" and "Hey You!", two singles from Tragic Kingdom, neither of which were commercially successful, or "Squeal" and "Doghouse" from The Beacon Street Collection, which were both independently released. "Girls Get the Bass in the Back", a remix of "Hey Baby", and a live acoustic version of "Underneath It All" were included as bonus tracks on international pressings of the album.

Production
Being a greatest hits album and containing only one new song, recording The Singles 1992–2003 took very little time compared with the band's studio albums. Production started in September 2003 with the recording of a cover version of Talk Talk's song "It's My Life", produced by Nellee Hooper. The accompanying music video for the song was filmed by director David LaChapelle at the Ambassador Hotel in Los Angeles. Stefani insisted that just because no songwriting was involved in the production of the album did not mean no effort would be needed: the band had to decide which of their songs to include and which to leave out. Two months later on November 25, the album was released along with the B-side, rarity, and remix collection Everything in Time and box set Boom Box.

Singles
The only single from The Singles 1992–2003 was a cover of the song "It's My Life", originally released in 1984 by the synth-pop band Talk Talk. Because the band were taking a break while lead singer Stefani recorded her solo debut album Love. Angel. Music. Baby., they decided to do a cover version to avoid having to write a new song. The band listened to hundreds of songs and narrowed it down to "It's My Life" and the song "Don't Change", released in 1982 by Australian new wave band INXS. No Doubt had doubts on recording a cover and contemplated writing new material, but decided on "It's My Life" after rehearsing the song with producer Nellee Hooper, referring to it as a "feel-good" song. Stefani stated:

"It's My Life" later became one of the band's biggest hits, being certified platinum by the Australian Recording Industry Association (ARIA) and gold by the Recording Industry Association of America (RIAA). The song was nominated for Best Pop Performance by a Duo or Group with Vocals at the 47th Grammy Awards, but lost out to Los Lonely Boys' "Heaven". Stuart Price (also known as Jacques Lu Cont), the song's programmer, created the Thin White Duke mix of "It's My Life", which won the award for Best Remixed Recording, Non-Classical.

Critical reception

The Singles 1992–2003 received generally positive reviews from music critics. Mike McGuirk of Rhapsody described the album as "a real joy for anyone who has a taste for Gwen Stefani's yearning vocals and her band's uncanny ability to mix ska, teen pop and hip-hop." Stephen Thomas Erlewine of AllMusic called the album a "stellar collection", concluding that it is "the kind of compilation that satisfies fans of all stripes and converts skeptics. It's the greatest-hits package that [No Doubt] deserve[s]." Anthony Thornton of NME stated, "Despite being an album packed with as much drama as the band themselves have suffered, it'll be the pop anthems you come back for and fortunately there's enough here to keep even the soap addicts happy." Sara McDonnell of musicOMH wrote that the album's music had "sheer diversity" due to the band's "pick 'n mix approach to musical styles". The high points were "Gwen Stefani's lyrics, which deal principally with coming to terms with her own femininity" and "the band's collaborations with various hip producers", such as The Neptunes, Nellee Hooper and Sly and Robbie; and the low points were the album's "hotch-potch feel", "random tracklisting" and the "forays into reggae". Ruth Mitchell of the BBC Music viewed the album as a typical Christmas album that was "unlikely to stand out from the crowd" and "too long, [getting] tiresome about half way through", although complimenting "Just a Girl", "Hey Baby" and "Underneath It All". However, she also expressed disappointment at the placement of "Don't Speak", "the foursome's most glorious pop moment", at the end of the album. The Rolling Stone Album Guide later gave the album four stars out of five.

Commercial performance
The Singles 1992–2003 debuted at number two on the Billboard 200, selling 253,000 copies in its first week. The album was certified double platinum by the Recording Industry Association of America (RIAA) on July 21, 2004, and had sold 2,474,000 copies in the United States. In Canada, the album was certified double platinum on June 13, 2005 by the Canadian Recording Industry Association (CRIA), denoting sales of over 200,000 copies. In Australia, the album was certified gold in 2003 and platinum in 2004 by the Australian Recording Industry Association, signalling sales of over 35,000 and 70,000 units, respectively.

Track listing

Notes
  signifies an additional producer
  signifies an executive producer
  signifies a remixer

Personnel
Credits adapted from the liner notes of The Singles 1992–2003.

No Doubt
 Gwen Stefani – vocals
 Tony Kanal – bass guitar, keyboards ; programming ; saxophone 
 Tom Dumont – guitar, keyboards ; programming 
 Adrian Young – drums, percussion
 Eric Stefani – keyboards, piano (1986–1995)

Additional musicians

 Matthew Wilder – additional keyboards 
 Stuart Price – programming 
 Gabrial McNair – keyboards ; horn arrangement , piano ; trombone ; synthesizer ; Mellotron 
 Bounty Killer – vocals 
 Sly Dunbar – programming 
 Philip Steir – additional programming 
 Stephen Bradley – trumpet 
 Fabien Waltmann – programming 
 Lady Saw – vocals 
 Ned Douglas – programming 
 Robbie Shakespeare – additional melodic bass 
 Andy Potts – saxophone 
 Django Stewart – saxophone 
 Phil Jordan – trumpet 
 Stephen Perkins – steel drum 
 Melissa Hasin – cello 
 Eric Carpenter – saxophone 
 Don Hammerstedt – trumpet 
 Alex Henderson – trombone

Technical

 Matthew Wilder – production 
 Phil Kaffel – recording 
 George Landress – recording 
 David J. Holman – mixing 
 Paul Palmer – mixing 
 Nellee Hooper – production 
 No Doubt – production 
 Karl Derfler – recording 
 Kevin Mills – engineering assistance 
 Mark "Spike" Stent – mixing ; additional production 
 Sly & Robbie – production 
 Dan Chase – recording 
 Philip Steir – additional production ; remix 
 Count – additional engineering 
  Mendez – additional engineering 
 Rory Baker – additional engineering 
 Toby Whalen – engineering assistance 
 Tom Dumont – additional recording 
 Tony Kanal – additional recording 
 Brian Jobson – executive production 
 Wayne Jobson – executive production 
 Wayne Wilkins – mix programming 
 Paul "P Dub" Watson – mix programming 
 John Gould – additional mix programming 
 Matt Fields – mix engineering assistance 
 David Treahearn – mix engineering assistance 
 Keith Uddin – mix engineering assistance 
 Glen Ballard – production 
 Alain Johannes – recording 
 Scott Campbell – additional recording 
 Bryan Carrigan – additional recording 
 Jack Joseph Puig – mixing 
 Greg Collins – recording 
 Simon Gogerly – additional engineering 
 Anthony Kilhoffer – engineering assistance 
 Ian Rossiter – engineering assistance 
 Jerry Harrison – production 
 Sean Beavan – sonic manipulation 
 Matt Hyde – recording 
 Dito Godwin – production 
 Michael Carnevale – recording 
 Brian "Big Bass" Gardner – mastering
 Chuck Reed – post-engineering
 Jared Andersen – post-engineering

Artwork

 Jolie Clemens – art direction, design
 Nicole Frantz – photography, art coordination
 Stephanie Hsu – photography, art coordination
 Cindy Cooper – album packaging coordination
 Frank W. Ockenfels 3 – cover photography
 Paris Montoya – liner notes
 Tom Lanham – liner notes
 Joseph Cultice – photography
 F. Scott Schafer – photography
 David LaChapelle – photography
 Daniel Arsenault – photography
 Sonya Farrell – photography
 Jeffrey Bender – photography
 Chris Cuffaro – photography

Charts

Weekly charts

Year-end charts

Certifications

Release history

References

2003 greatest hits albums
Albums produced by Glen Ballard
Albums produced by Jerry Harrison
Albums produced by Matthew Wilder
Albums produced by Nellee Hooper
Interscope Records compilation albums
No Doubt compilation albums